Katie Smith (born June 4, 1974) is lead assistant coach for the Minnesota Lynx of the Women's National Basketball Association (WNBA). She is the former head coach of the New York Liberty.

A retired professional basketball player, Smith's primary position was shooting guard, although she sometimes played small forward or point guard. She was the all-time leading scorer in women's professional basketball, having achieved over 7000 points in both her ABL and WNBA career. In 2016, she was voted one of the WNBA Top 20@20. On March 31, 2018, Smith was named to the 2018 class of inductees for the Naismith Memorial Basketball Hall of Fame. In the same year, Smith was also inducted into the Women's Basketball Hall of Fame.

Early life
Smith was born in Logan, Ohio, where she spent her formative years. She began playing basketball as early as the 5th grade on a boys' team and took tap dance and ballet lessons as a youngster.

She grew up in a family of student-athletes. Her father, John Jr., played football at Ohio University (OU), and won three varsity letters in the 1960s before becoming a dentist. Her younger brother, Tom, earned three varsity letters playing football at Ohio University as well as being a member on their track and field team. Tom won the 1996 Mid-American Conference championship in the discus throw. Her older brother, John, was a member of one of 11 University of Mount Union football teams that won the NCAA Division III title. He now is the head football coach at Bexley High School.

High school career
At Logan High School she was named the national Gatorade National Player of the Year during her senior year as she guided the Lady Chieftains to the Division I Ohio Girls' Basketball state championship game. Smith was named a High School All-American by the WBCA. She participated in the inaugural WBCA High School All-America Game in 1992, scoring fourteen points, and earning MVP honors.

College career
Smith attended Ohio State University in Columbus, Ohio from 1992 to 1996, and helped lead the Buckeyes to a Big Ten championship and the NCAA title game her freshman year. During her career at OSU, Smith broke the Big Ten scoring record for points scored in a career, in men's or women's basketball. She earned two Big Ten Conference player of the year awards as a senior: the conference's own award and the Chicago Tribune Silver Basketball.

Smith graduated in 1996 with a degree in zoology. On January 21, 2001, Ohio State honored her as the first female Buckeye athlete to have her number retired. She was also inducted into the Ohio State Varsity O Hall of Fame in October 2001.

Ohio State statistics
Source

Professional career

ABL
Smith played for the Columbus Quest of the ABL, helping the team to win both League championships in its only two full seasons of existence.

WNBA
In 2005, she became the first American female basketball player to score 5,000 total points in a professional career.

On August 16, 2007 she became the first professional women's basketball player to score 6,000 career points (ABL and WNBA combined). At the end of her career in 2013 Katie had a total of 7,885 professional career points, including 1,433 from the ABL and 6,452 from the WNBA.

From 1999 to 2005 Smith played for the Minnesota Lynx, where her outside shooting was the central focus of the Lynx offense. On July 30, 2005, Smith was traded to the Detroit Shock along with the Lynx's 2006 second round pick, for Chandi Jones, Stacey Thomas and the Shock's 2006 first round draft pick.

In 2006, Smith became the first WNBA player to win All Star games as a member of both the Eastern and Western Conference teams. She also became the only player to earn both ABL and WNBA championship rings when the Shock won the WNBA title, defeating the Sacramento Monarchs, the same year.

Smith was the MVP of the 2008 WNBA Finals, when the Detroit Shock beat the San Antonio Silver Stars 3–0.

On March 16, 2010, Katie Smith signed a contract with the Washington Mystics as a free agent.

On April 29, 2011, Smith was acquired by the Seattle Storm in a three-team trade with the Washington Mystics and Indiana Fever. At the 2011 WNBA All-Star Game, she was announced as one of the Top 15 players in the fifteen-year history of the WNBA as voted by fans.

On September 11, 2011 Katie Smith became the third player to score 6,000 points in her WNBA career.

In 2013, Smith was picked up by the New York Liberty and announced that the 2013 season would be her last.

Europe
During the 2001–02 season she played for Polish Lotos Gdynia. They reached the final of EuroLeague Women. In 2009, she played for Turkish Fenerbahçe Istanbul.

National team career
Smith was chosen to join the team which was invited to the 1993 U19 World Championship (then called the Junior World Championship). The team won five games and lost two, but that left them in seventh place. Smith was the second leading scorer for the team with 9.9 points per game

Smith represented the US at the 1995 World University Games held in Fukuoka, Japan in August and September 1995. The team had a record of 5–1, securing the silver medal. The USA team won early and reached a record of 5–0 when the USA beat Yugoslavia. In the semi-final game, the USA faced Russia. The team was behind much of the first half but managed to tie the game at the half. The USA broke the game open in the second half and won 101–74. The gold medal match was against unbeaten Italy. The Italian team started strong, scoring 12 of the first 14 points of  the contest. Sylvia Crawley scored eight consecutive points to end the first half, but that left the USA nine points behind. The USA took a small lead in the second half, but the team from Italy responded with a ten-point run, and won the game and the gold medal by a score of 73–65. Smith averaged 4.4 points per game during the event.

Smith was invited to be a member of the Jones Cup team representing the US in 1996. She helped the team to a 9–0 record, and the gold medal in the event. Smith averaged 6.8 points per game.

As a member of the USAB women's senior national team, Smith helped the US earn the gold medals in the 2000, 2004 and 2008 Olympics as well as the 1998 and 2002 World Championships.

Smith was named to the USA national team in 1998. The national team traveled to Berlin, Germany in July and August 1998 for the FIBA World Championships. The USA team won a close opening game against Japan 95–89, then won their next six games easily. In the semifinal game against Brazil, the USA team was behind as much as ten points in the first half, but the USA went on to win 93–79. The gold medal game was a rematch against Russia. In the first game, the USA team dominated almost from the beginning, but in the rematch, the team from Russia took the early lead and led much of the way. With under two minutes remaining, the USA was down by two points but the USA responded, then held on to win the gold medal 71–65. Smith averaged 9.3 points per game.

WNBA career statistics

Regular season

|-
| align="left" | 1999
| align="left" | Minnesota
| 30 || 29 || 32.4 || .387 || .382 || .766 || 2.9 || 2.0 || 0.6 || 0.3 || 1.83 || 11.7
|-
| align="left" | 2000
| align="left" | Minnesota
| 32 || 32 || style="background:#D3D3D3"|37.3° || .421 || .379 || .869 || 2.9 || 2.8 || 1.4 || 0.2 || 2.38 || 20.2
|-
| align="left" | 2001
| align="left" | Minnesota
| 32 || 32 || style="background:#D3D3D3"|38.6° || .393 || .354 || .895 || 3.8 || 2.2 || 0.7 || 0.2 || 2.72 || style="background:#D3D3D3"|23.1°
|-
| align="left" | 2002
| align="left" | Minnesota
| 31 || 31 || style="background:#D3D3D3"|36.7° || .404 || .330 || .824 || 3.0 || 2.5 || 1.0 || 0.2 || 2.26 || 16.5
|-
| align="left" | 2003
| align="left" | Minnesota
| 34 || 34 || 34.9 || .457 || .390 || .881 || 4.1 || 2.5 || 0.7 || 0.2 || 1.97 || 18.2
|-
| align="left" | 2004
| align="left" | Minnesota
| 23 || 23 || 34.8 || .431 || .432 || .899 || 3.7 || 2.3 || 1.0 || 0.3 || 2.22 || 18.8
|-
| align="left" | 2005*
| align="left" | Minnesota
| 23 || 23 || 33.3 || .383 || .337 || .789 || 2.4 || 2.7 || 1.1 || 0.1 || 2.35 || 13.3
|-
| align="left" | 2005*
| align="left" | Detroit
| 13 || 9 || 30.3 || .374 || .327 || .765 || 2.2 || 2.0 || 0.4 || 0.2 || 1.31 || 9.5
|-
| align="left" | 2005
| align="left" | Total
| style="background:#D3D3D3"|36° || 32 || 32.3 || .380 || .333 || .782 || 2.3 || 2.4 || 0.8 || 0.1 || 2.00 || 11.9
|-
|style="text-align:left;background:#afe6ba;"| 2006†
| align="left" | Detroit
| 34 || 34 || 33.4 || .407 || .366 || .912 || 2.7 || 3.3 || 0.7 || 0.1 || 1.91 || 11.7
|-
| align="left" | 2007
| align="left" | Detroit
| 34 || 34 || 34.3 || .361 || .311 || .847 || 3.8 || 3.6 || 1.2 || 0.1 || 1.74 || 13.2
|-
|style="text-align:left;background:#afe6ba;"| 2008†
| align="left" | Detroit
| 34 || 34 || 33.9 || .383 || .360 || .887 || 2.8 || 4.0 || 0.9 || 0.1 || 2.35 || 14.7
|-
| align="left" | 2009
| align="left" | Detroit
| 27 || 27 || 33.1 || .435 || .432 || .918 || 2.3 || 2.8 || 0.8 || 0.1 || 2.30 || 13.7
|-
| align="left" | 2010
| align="left" | Washington
| 33 || 33 || 30.8 || .395 || .362 || .764 || 2.1 || 2.6 || 0.7 || 0.2 || 1.61 || 9.5
|-
| align="left" | 2011
| align="left" | Seattle
| 34 || 3 || 25.1 || .395 || .395 || .857 || 2.3 || 2.0 || 0.7 || 0.2 || 1.32 || 7.5
|-
| align="left" | 2012
| align="left" | Seattle
| 34 || 31 || 27 || .412 || .4 || .838 || 2.7 || 2.1 || 0.6 || 0.1 || 1.5 || 6.7
|- 
| align="left" | 2013
| align="left" | New York
| 34 || 30 || 26.6 || .374 || .315 || .848 || 1.9 || 1.8 || 0.7 || 0.2 || 1.26 || 6.1
|- 
| align="left" | Career
| align="left" |14 years, 4 teams
| 448 || 409 || 33.1 || .405 || .369 || .859 || 2.9 || 2.7 || 0.9 || 0.2 || 1.99 || 13.9

Postseason

|-
| align="left" | 2003
| align="left" | Minnesota
| 3 || 3 || style="background:#D3D3D3"|40.0° || .429 || .357 || .917 || 4.3 || 3.0 || 0.3 || 0.0 || 2.67 || 17.3
|-
| align="left" | 2005
| align="left" | Detroit
| 2 || 2 || 33.5 || .269 || .200 || 1 || 3.0 || 0.5 || 1.0 || 0.0 || 1 || 10.5
|-
|style="text-align:left;background:#afe6ba;"| 2006†
| align="left" | Detroit
| 10 || 10 || 36.8 || .436 || .4 || .735 || 2.5 || 4.0 || 0.5 || 0.0 || 2.40 || 14.7
|-
| align="left" | 2007
| align="left" | Detroit
| 11 || 11 || 35.7 || .341 || .342 || .760 || 3.2 || 3.6 || 0.7 || 0.2 || 2.27 || 12.2
|-
|style="text-align:left;background:#afe6ba;"| 2008†
| align="left" | Detroit
| 9 || 9 || 34.3 || .410 || .354 || .758 || 4.0 || 2.4 || 0.4 || 0.1 || 1.78 || 15.3
|-
| align="left" | 2010
| align="left" | Washington
| 2 || 2 || 27.5 || .333 || .143 || .833 || 4.0 || 1.0 || 0.5 || 0.0 || 1.50 || 7.0
|-
| align="left" | 2011
| align="left" | Seattle
| 3 || 0 || 25.3 || .174 || .286 || 1 || 3 || 2.3 || 0.7 || 0 || 0.67 || 5.3
|-
| align="left" | 2012
| align="left" | Seattle
| 3 || 3 || 37.3 || .455 || .4 || .667 || 2.3 || 2 || 1 || 0 || 1.67 || 9.3
|-
| align="left" | Career
| align="left" |8 years, 4 teams
| 43 || 40 || 34.9 || .381 || .345 || .784 || 3.2 || 3 || 0.6 || 0.1 || 1.98 || 12.8

Coaching career

Following the end of the Liberty's 2013 season, she was named one of the team's assistant coaches, replacing the departing Taj McWilliams-Franklin. Smith was named associate head coach of the New York Liberty for the 2016 season. She was elevated to head coach in October 2017. She was the head coach in the 2018 and 2019 seasons, but her contract was not renewed for 2020. Smith then became the lead assistant coach for the Minnesota Lynx.

Coaching record

|-
| style="text-align:left;"| NYL
| style="text-align:left;"| 2018
|34||7||27|||| style="text-align:center;"|5th in Eastern||—||—||—||—
| style="text-align:center;"|Missed Playoffs
|-
| style="text-align:left;"| NYL
| style="text-align:left;"| 2019
|34||10||24|||| style="text-align:center;"|5th in Eastern||—||—||—||—
| style="text-align:center;"|Missed Playoffs
|- class="sortbottom"
| style="text-align:left;"|Career
| ||68||17||51|||| ||0||0||0||

See also
 Basketball in the United States
 List of WNBA players

References

External links
 WNBA Player Profile
 Olympic Player Profile
 Katie Smith's U.S. Olympic Team bio

1974 births
Living people
All-American college women's basketball players
American expatriate basketball people in Poland
American expatriate basketball people in Turkey
American women's basketball players
Basketball coaches from Ohio
Basketball players at the 2000 Summer Olympics
Basketball players at the 2004 Summer Olympics
Basketball players at the 2008 Summer Olympics
Basketball players from Ohio
Columbus Quest players
Detroit Shock players
Fenerbahçe women's basketball players
LGBT basketball players
LGBT people from Ohio
Lesbian sportswomen
Medalists at the 2000 Summer Olympics
Medalists at the 2004 Summer Olympics
Medalists at the 2008 Summer Olympics
Minnesota Lynx coaches
Minnesota Lynx players
Naismith Memorial Basketball Hall of Fame inductees
New York Liberty coaches
New York Liberty head coaches
Ohio State Buckeyes women's basketball players
Olympic gold medalists for the United States in basketball
Parade High School All-Americans (girls' basketball)
People from Fairfield County, Ohio
People from Logan, Ohio
Shooting guards
Small forwards
Universiade medalists in basketball
Universiade silver medalists for the United States
Washington Mystics players
Women's National Basketball Association All-Stars
Medalists at the 1995 Summer Universiade
United States women's national basketball team players